Yurino is a rural locality (a village) in Vorshinskoye Rural Settlement, Sobinsky District, Vladimir Oblast, Russia. The population was 32 as of 2010.

Geography 
The village is located on the Koloksha River, 10 km north-east from Vorsha, 19 km north-east from Sobinka.

References 

Rural localities in Sobinsky District